Kibana is a source-available data visualization dashboard software for Elasticsearch, whose free and open source fork in OpenSearch is OpenSearch Dashboards.

History 

Kibana provides visualization capabilities on top of the content indexed on an Elasticsearch cluster. Users can create bar, line and scatter plots, or pie charts and maps on top of large volumes of data.

Kibana also provides a presentation tool, referred to as Canvas, that allows users to create slide decks that pull live data directly from Elasticsearch.

The combination of Elasticsearch, Logstash, and Kibana, referred to as the "Elastic Stack" (formerly the "ELK stack"), is available as a product or service. Logstash provides an input stream to Elasticsearch for storage and search, and Kibana accesses the data for visualizations such as dashboards. Elastic also provides "Beats" packages which can be configured to provide pre-made Kibana visualizations and dashboards about various database and application technologies.

In December 2019, Elastic introduced Kibana Lens product.

In May 2021, OpenSearch released the first beta of OpenSearch Dashboards, the Apache-licensed fork of Kibana sponsored by Amazon Web Services after Elastic discontinued the open source project and switched to proprietary software development.

References

External links
 
 

Data visualization software
Articles containing video clips